Primrose Hill is a ward in the London Borough of Camden, in the United Kingdom. The ward represents the area of the same name, and the eastern part of the Swiss Cottage area. The ward was first used for the 2022 Camden London Borough Council election, and elects three councillors to Camden London Borough Council. Most of its area was previously in the Camden Town with Primrose Hill and Swiss Cottage wards, which were be abolished at the same time, and a small part was transferred from the Belsize ward. In 2018, the ward had an electorate of 8,982. The Boundary Commission projects the electorate to rise to 9,049 in 2025.

The ward contains a part of Primrose Hill park, Swiss Cottage Library and the Hampstead Theatre. Schools in the ward include UCL Academy, Swiss Cottage special school and St Paul's CE primary. The area houses the Chalcots Estate and the Adelaide medical Centre.

History

In January 2022, in the leadup to the ward's creation, councillors for the Camden Town and Primrose Hill ward Pat Callaghan and Richard Cotton lamented the Local Government Boundary Commission for England's redrawing of the wards of Camden, which split Camden Town with Primrose Hill into separate Camden Town and Primrose Hill wards. Callaghan and Cotton will stand in the Camden Town ward at the 2022 council election.

Election results

Elections in the 2020s

References

Wards of the London Borough of Camden
Primrose Hill
Swiss Cottage
2022 establishments in England